The 420 World Championships are international sailing regattas in the 420 class organized by the International Sailing Federation and the International 420 Class Association.

They have been held every year since 1973.

Editions

Medalists

Open

Men and Mixed

Women

Under 17

References

External links
 Official international class website

World championships in sailing
Recurring sporting events established in 1973
420 (dinghy) competitions